Uttan is a coastal town just north of Mumbai in Thane district of Maharashtra. A coastal town, it comes under the jurisdiction of the Mira-Bhayandar Municipal Corporation. Part Jurisdiction is also handed over to the Mumbai Meteropolitan Region Development Authority (MMRDA). Uttan is located 8 km away from Bhayandar.

Some of the recreational places closest to Uttan are:
 Dharavi mata mandir, Tarodi village, Uttan 
 Essel World and Water Kingdom
 Gorai
 Keshav Srushti
 Global Vipassana Pagoda

References

Mira-Bhayandar
Suburbs of Mumbai
Cities and towns in Thane district